Hampyeong O clan was one of the Korean clans. Their Bon-gwan was in Hampyeong County, South Jeolla Province. According to the research in 2000, the number of Hampyeong O clan was 2845. Then,  successively served as a munha sirang pyeongjangsa and appointed as Prince of Hampung. After that,  began Hampyeong O clan.

See also 
 Korean clan names of foreign origin

References

External links 
 

 
Korean clan names of Chinese origin